Xylota spurivulgaris is a species of hoverfly in the family Syrphidae.

Distribution
China.

References

Eristalinae
Insects described in 1998
Diptera of Asia